Luna 28 (Luna Resource 2 or Luna-Grunt rover) is a proposed sample-return mission from the south polar region of the Moon.

Mission 
Luna 28 is proposed to launch no earlier than 2027, and it would be composed of a stationary lunar lander and a lunar rover. The rover would bring soil samples back to the lander and transfer them into the ascent stage, which would launch and insert itself into a 100 km lunar orbit. While in lunar orbit, the soil-carrying capsule would be intercepted by an orbiting return module, which would perform all rendezvous operations and transfer the samples. After reloading the samples, the return vehicle separates from the orbiter and heads to Earth, while the orbital module continues its mission in the lunar orbit for at least three years.

Potential collaboration 
NASA is assessing a potential cooperation with Russia for Luna 25 through Luna 28.

References

External links 
 Lunar and Planetary Department Moscow University
 Soviet Luna Chronology
 Exploring the Moon: Luna Missions

Missions to the Moon
Russian space probes
Russian lunar exploration program
2020s in Russia
2027 in spaceflight
Proposed space probes